Kiana Ledé Brown (born April 3, 1997) is an American singer, songwriter, actress, and pianist currently based in Los Angeles, California. She starred as Zoe Vaughn on the second season of MTV's horror series Scream. Ledé also starred as Veronica Washington on Netflix's original series All About the Washingtons. Kiana's debut album, Kiki, was released on April 3, 2020.

Early life and education
Kiana Ledé Brown was born on the outskirts of Phoenix, Arizona. Her father is of African American and Indigenous American descent, while her mother is Hispanic of Mexican-American descent. As an infant, Ledé began to sing the alphabet immediately after learning it and began performing at the age of 3 upon receiving her first karaoke machine. As a child, Ledé began to regularly perform in school plays and beauty pageants while taking voice lessons and piano study. She would regularly get kicked out of class for singing, prompting her mother to enroll her in a performing arts school so she could put her talent to good use. She attended Mountain Pointe High School.

Career
In 2011, Ledé's mother discovered Kidz Bop, a website for kids to upload and share videos of themselves performing. She uploaded a video of Ledé performing an original number on the piano which was selected as a finalist. After performing Adele's "Someone Like You" to earn her a place in the Top 4, Ledé won the 2011 KIDZ Star USA Grand Prize out of 45,000 submissions, the largest national talent competition for kids ages 15 and under.

At a school assembly, Ledé was told that she won the national talent search by American Idol winner Kris Allen. The prize included a RCA Records recording contract and a starring role in the Kidz Bop 21 music video and commercial. Allen said after seeing her live, "she went from 'She's good' to 'She is no doubt gonna win this thing.'"

Ledé said she had the opportunity to listen to and select from her top three song choices. After considering and listening to the songs, she said she chose her first single "Hey Chica" because of the upbeat tempo. The song was released June 19, 2012. Brown has performed the song on The Today Show and at the 86th annual Macy's Thanksgiving Day Parade. She also performed "Do The Mermaid" from Barbie in A Mermaid Tale 2.

In 2012, Ledé was named cover girl for Miss Moxie's Holiday 2012 issue. The site praised "Hey Chica" for promoting a "clear message of self-empowerment and encourages young women to feel beautiful in their own skin".

At the age of 16, Ledé moved to North Hollywood. She worked at a gymnastics center and a jazz club due to her receiving no advance from RCA Records. As artists do, she wanted more creative control of her music, so she showed the label what she was working on. They did not see potential in her work, and dropped her a month later. She was later motivated by Grammy award-winning production duo Rice N' Peas to perform cover songs. The series was dubbed "Soulfood Sessions" and helped her gain a following.

In 2016, Ledé was cast in the series regular role as Zoe Vaughn on the second season of MTV's Scream. In 2018, she also accepted a lead role alongside Joseph Simmons of Run-DMC in the Netflix original series All About The Washingtons. The series was cancelled after only one season.

Following her departure from RCA Records, Ledé signed with Republic Records after her rendition of Drake's "Hotline Bling" helped gain their attention. She would later release her debut EP Selfless in July 2018. The EP includes her breakout single "Ex", which became her first entry to the Billboard charts, peaking at number 9 on the US R&B Songs charts and at number 1 in several countries. It has earned platinum status from the RIAA as of June 2020. To promote Selfess, she served as opening act with Ro James on Jessie J's R.O.S.E. Tour. She and Lucky Daye also opened up for the Ella Mai The Debut Tour at Brooklyn Steel in New York on March 12, 2019.

Ledé's second studio EP, Myself, was released in June 2019, and included the single "Bouncin" featuring rapper Offset, which peaked within the top 30 of Billboard'''s rhythmic airplay chart. She would also embark on her first headlining tour that same year.

Stand-alone singles "Title" and "Easy Breezy" would build momentum for her debut album, which Ledé had been working on for some time. Her highly anticipated 17-track debut album, titled Kiki was released on April 3, 2020, which debuted at number 30 on the Billboard 200. The album features guest appearances from R&B stars Ari Lennox, 6LACK and more. The lead single "Mad at Me" interpolates Outkast's 2000 hit song "So Fresh, So Clean".

A tour was planned starting in Europe, but it was eventually postponed to 2021 due to the COVID-19 pandemic. She is currently scheduled to perform across Europe on May 23.

Ledé would later make a few guest appearances on tracks with Usher, Queen Naija and others. She released the deluxe edition of Kiki on October 23, including seven bonus tracks. In 2021, Ledé was featured on the first all-female compilation album, Big Femme Energy Volume 1'', with her track "Cut 'Em Off".

Filmography

Discography

Studio albums

Extended plays

Singles

As lead artist

As featured artist

Promotional singles

Other charted songs

Other appearances

References

External links 
 
 
 

1997 births
Living people
21st-century African-American women singers
American women singer-songwriters
21st-century American women singers
21st-century American singers
21st-century American women pianists
21st-century American pianists
Republic Records artists
American singer-songwriters
African-American songwriters
African-American pianists